Amreli is one of the 182 Legislative Assembly constituencies of Gujarat state in India.

It is part of Amreli district.

List of segments
This assembly seat represents the following segments
Amreli city
 Amreli Taluka
 Vadia Taluka – Entire taluka except village – Devalki

Members of Legislative Assembly

Election results

2022

2017

2012

See also
 List of constituencies of Gujarat Legislative Assembly
 Gujarat Legislative Assembly
 Amreli district

References

External links
 

Assembly constituencies of Gujarat
Amreli district